The Franklin County Courthouse is a government building located in Benton, Illinois. It took 620 days to complete from start to finish, costing around $13 million for the courthouse itself. A nearby government building also saw renovations so it could house the courtrooms and the Circuit Clerk's office while the courthouse was under construction. That brought the total cost to around $18 million.

The courthouse was finished ahead of schedule and was reported to have been cheaper than fixing the previous courthouse.

References

Courthouses in Illinois